100 Days Before the Command (translit. Sto dney do prikaza) is a 1990 Soviet drama film directed  by Hussein Erkenov, inspired by the eponymous novel written by Yuri Polyakov.

In order to get Gorki Studios to provide funding for the film, Erkenov and writers Yuri Polyakov and Vladimir Golodov provided the studio with two fake scripts in addition to the real one. The Soviet government censored the film and banned its export. It was not screened outside of the country until the Berlin International Film Festival in 1994 after Erkenov founded his own sales company.

Synopsis 
The film lays bare the cruelties inflicted on young Red Army recruits by their superiors at a training camp in Central Russia. The film has no narrative structure and rather than telling a story uses vignettes with minimal dialogue to expose the conditions in which Soviet army recruits lived. The film explores themes of homoeroticism.

Cast
 Vladimir Zamansky as The Unknown Man
 Armen Dzhigarkhanyan as Brigade Commander
 Oleg Vasilkov as Elin
 Roman Grekov as Zub
 Valeriy Troshin as Kudrin
 Aleksandr Chislov as Zyrin
 Mikhail Solomatin as Belikov
 Sergey Romantsov as Titarenko
 Sergey Bystritsky as Senior Lieutenant
 Elena Kondulainen as Death
 Oleg Khusainov as Angel
 Sergey Semyonov as Captain
 Maria Politseymako as woman in the field
 Vadim Piyankov as lance-corporal

References

External links

1990 drama films
1990 LGBT-related films
1990 films
1990 in the Soviet Union
Gorky Film Studio films
Soviet drama films
Soviet LGBT-related films
Russian LGBT-related films
LGBT-related drama films
Military of Russia in films
Films about military personnel
1990s Russian-language films